Shukman is a surname. Notable people with the surname include: 

David Shukman (born 1958), British journalist
Henry Shukman (born 1962), British poet and writer
Harold Shukman (1931–2012), British historian

See also
Shulman